Good Morning, Judge may refer to:
 Good Morning, Judge (1943 film), an American comedy film
 Good Morning, Judge (1928 film), an American silent comedy film
 Good Morning Judge, a song by 10cc